Avaş is a village and municipality in the Yardymli Rayon of Azerbaijan.  It has a population of 962.  The municipality consists of the villages of Avaş, Qaravuldaş, and Deman.

References 

Populated places in Yardimli District